Simplice Behanzin, popularly known by his stage name Pipi Wobaho, is a Beninese singer, comedian and actor. He is the founding member of the 'Sèmako Wobaho theater and cinema company'.

Personal life
Wobaho was born in Cotonou, Benin.

Career
He began his theater career with his brother Arnaud Behanzin and Dah Houawé. In 1987, they formed a group formerly called "Gbenonkpo". It is a theater and cinema company bringing together several Beninese actors.

He is also a popular actor in Beninese theater and cinema. In 2003, Wobaho along with his closest friend Pierre Zinko aka Wet Elephant founded the "Sèmako Wobaho theater and cinema company" to improve the quality of Beninese cinema and theater. Their collaboration leads to several theatrical works on the Beninese scene. However, they broke up in 2013. In 2008, the company produced popular film If it was you?, a series resulting from a collaboration with several other Beninese comedians. In 2012, the Sèmako Wobaho duo made the film Capricious Apprentice.

Wobaho is a specialist in traditional "Akonhou" music. In 2011, he released an album called Akonhou djobé. He acted in two popular films Sorry (continued) and New Dot Method, which is a video album of two films at 1000F Cfa, presented by Agbafafa production.

In November 2014, Wobaho was elected to the Ministry of Culture. Later in 2015, he was elected as head of the National Commission for the Fight against Piracy.

Filmography

References

External links
 Humour : La compagnie Sèmako soulage

Living people
Beninese male film actors
21st-century comedians
Year of birth missing (living people)